Bermuda women's national softball team is the national team for Bermuda.  The team competed at the 1990 ISF Women's World Championship in Normal, Illinois where they finished with 1 win and 8 losses.  The team competed at the 1994 ISF Women's World Championship in St. John's, Newfoundland where they finished twenty-fourth.

References

External links 
 International Softball Federation

Softball
Women's national softball teams
Women's sport in Bermuda
Softball in Bermuda